is a 1981 Japanese film by director Shohei Imamura. It was screened in the Un Certain Regard section at the 1981 Cannes Film Festival.

Plot 
The film depicts carnivalesque atmosphere summed up by the cry "Ee ja nai ka" ("Why not?") in Japan in 1867 and 1868 in the days leading to the Meiji Restoration. It examines the effects of the political and social upheaval of the time, and culminates in a revelrous march on the Tokyo Imperial Palace, which turns into a massacre.  Characteristically, Imamura focuses not on the leaders of the country, but on characters in the lower classes and on the fringes of society.

Cast
 Kaori Momoi - Ine
 Shigeru Izumiya - Genji
 Shigeru Tsuyuguchi - Kinzo
 Masao Kusakari - Itoman
 Mitsuko Baisho - Oko
 Yōhei Kōno - Hara Ichinoshin
 Taiji Tonoyama
 Junzaburō Ban - Toramatsu
 Nenji Kobayashi - Matakichi
 Hideo Takamatsu - Koide Yamato no Kami
 Ako - Oyoshi
 Kazuo Kitamura - Koide Yamatonokami
 Jirō Yabuki - Senmatsu
 Yasuaki Kurata - Tsukinoki Hanjirō
 Hiroshi Inuzuka - Yamome no Roku
 Shōhei Hino - Magohichi
 Yūko Tanaka - Omatsu
 Ken Ogata - Furukawa
 Shoichi Ozawa - Sakunojo

Awards 
 Japanese Academy Awards 1982:
 Best Supporting Actress: Yūko Tanaka
 Newcomer of the Year: Yūko Tanaka 
 Blue Ribbon Awards 1982:
 Best Supporting Actress: Yūko Tanaka 
 Hochi Film Awards 1981: 
 Best Supporting Actress: Yūko Tanaka 
 Mainichi Film Concours 1982 : 
 Best Sound Recording: Shotaro Yoshida

See also
 1981 in film

References

External links
 
 
 
 
 Eejanaika at Rotten Tomatoes

Films directed by Shohei Imamura
1981 films
1981 drama films
1980s Japanese-language films
Shochiku films
Jidaigeki films
Films set in the 1860s
Films set in Bakumatsu
1980s Japanese films

tr:Ecanayka-Yetmedi mi